Grevillea oncogyne is a species of flowering plant in the family Proteaceae and is endemic to inland areas of Western Australia. It is an erect to spreading shrub with linear, sometimes lobed leaves, and clusters of red or pinkish red flowers.

Description
The edges of the leaves are rolled under, obscuring the lower surface.

Taxonomy
Grevillea oncogyne was first formally described in 1904 by Ludwig Diels in Ernst Georg Pritzel's Botanische Jahrbücher für Systematik, Pflanzengeschichte und Pflanzengeographie. The specific epithet (oncogyne) means "swollen woman", referring to swellings on the ovary.

Distribution and habitat
This grevillea grows on rocky outcrops in mallee woodlands and shrublands between Boorabbin, Coolgardie, Salmon Gums, Lake King and Hyden in the Avon Wheatbelt, Coolgardie, Esperance Plains and Mallee bioregions of inland south-western Western Australia.

Conservation status
Grevillea inconspicua is listed as "not threatened" by the Government of Western Australia Department of Biodiversity, Conservation and Attractions.

See also
 List of Grevillea species

References

oncogyne
Proteales of Australia
Eudicots of Western Australia
Plants described in 1904
Taxa named by Ludwig Diels